The Sir Robert Rede's Lecturer is an annual appointment to give a public lecture, the Sir Robert Rede's Lecture (usually Rede Lecture) at the University of Cambridge. It is named for Sir Robert Rede, who was Chief Justice of the Common Pleas in the sixteenth century.

Initial series
The initial series of lectures ranges from around 1668 to around 1856. In principle, there were three lectureships each year, on Logic, Philosophy and Rhetoric. These differed from the later individual lectures, in that they were appointments to a lectureship for a period of time, rather than an appointment for a one-off annual lecture. There was also a Mathematics lectureship which dated from an earlier time, while another term used was "Barnaby Lecturer", as the lecturers were elected on St Barnabas Day. A selection of the lecturers, who tended to have studied at Cambridge and be appointed after becoming Fellows of a College, is given below, with a full listing given in the sources.

Mathematics Lecturers

1550 James Pilkington
1593 William Alabaster
1641 Ralph Cudworth
1643 Nathaniel Culverwell

Barnaby Lecturers

1776 Thomas Starkie the Elder (Mathematics)
1738 Charles Moss (Mathematics)
1746 John Berridge (Mathematics)
1755 John Michell (Mathematics)
1758 Thomas Postlethwaite (Mathematics)
1763 John Jebb (Mathematics)
1765 Richard Watson (Mathematics)
1770 William Paley (Mathematics)
1783 William Farish (Mathematics)
1789 Francis John Hyde Wollaston (Mathematics)
1807 Robert Woodhouse (Mathematics)
1831 John Stevens Henslow (Mathematics)
1842 David Thomas Ansted (Mathematics)
1846 George Gabriel Stokes (Mathematics)
1851 Henry Richards Luard (Mathematics)
1855 Richard Shilleto (Mathematics)

Rede Lecturers

1706 John Addenbrooke (Logic)
1717 John Addenbrooke (Logic)
1723 John Jortin (Rhetoric)
1730 Edmund Law (Rhetoric)
1740 Thomas Pyle (Rhetoric)
1763 Richard Watson (Philosophy)
1764 John Jebb (Rhetoric)
1781 George Pretyman (Philosophy)
1783 Isaac Milner (Philosophy)
1785 William Farish (Logic)
1785 Joseph Dacre Carlyle (Rhetoric)
1794 Bewick Bridge (Logic)
1796 Bewick Bridge (Logic)
1798 George Butler (Logic)
1803 Bewick Bridge (Rhetoric)
1805 Ralph Tatham (Philosophy)
1806 George Cecil Renouard (Philosophy)
1809 Henry Bickersteth (Logic)
1812 John Kaye (Logic)
1819 George Peacock (Philosophy)
1822 Connop Thirlwall (Logic)
1825 John Stevens Henslow (Philosophy)
1828 Joshua King (Rhetoric)
1837 Edward Harold Browne (Philosophy)
1838 Samuel Earnshaw (Philosophy)
1843 John William Colenso (Philosophy)
1844 Joseph Woolley (Rhetoric)
1846 Hugh Andrew Johnstone Munro (Philosophy)
1850 Charles Anthony Swainson (Logic)
1851 John James Stewart Perowne (Philosophy)
1853 John Couch Adams (Philosophy)
1853 John James Stewart Perowne (Rhetoric)

New series
From 1858, the lecture was re-established as a one-off annual lecture, delivered by a person appointed by the Vice-Chancellor of the university. The names of the appointees and the titles of their lectures are given below.

1858-1899
1859 Richard Owen On the classifaction and geographical distribution of the Mammalia
1860 John Phillips Life on the earth, its origin and succession
1861 Robert Willis The social and architectural history of Trinity College
1862 Edward Sabine The cosmical features of terrestrial magnetism
1863 David Thomas Ansted The correlation of the natural history sciences
1864 George Biddell Airy The late observations of total eclipses of the sun, and the inferences from them
1865 John Tyndall On Radiation
1866 William Thomson The dissipation of energy
1867 John Ruskin The relation of national ethics to national art
1868 Friedrich Max Müller On the stratification of language
1869 William Huggins On the results of spectrum analysis of the heavenly bodies
1870 William Allen Miller On some chemical processes of forming organic compounds, with illustrations from the coal tar colours
1871 Joseph Norman Lockyer Recent solar discoveries
1872 Edward Augustus Freeman The Unity of History
1873 Peter Guthrie Tait Thermo-electricity
1874 Samuel White Baker Slavery
1875 Henry James Sumner Maine The effects of observation of India upon modern European thought
1876 Samuel Birch The monumental history of ancient Egypt
1877 Charles Wyville Thomson On some of the results of the expedition of H.M.S. Challenger
1878 James Clerk Maxwell On the telephone
1879 William Henry Dallinger 'The origin of life, illustrated by the life histories of the least and lowest organisms in nature'
1880 George Murray Humphry 'Man, prehistoric, present, future'
1881 William Muir The early Caliphate
1882 Matthew Arnold Literature and Science
1883 Thomas Henry Huxley 'The origin of the existing forms of animal life: construction or evolution?
1884 Francis Galton The Measurement of Human Faculty
1885 George John Romanes Mind and motion
1886 John Lubbock, 1st Baron Avebury On the forms of seedlings and the causes to which they are due
1887 John Robert Seeley Greater Britain in the Georgian and in the Victorian era
1888 Frederick Augustus Abel Applications of science to the protection of human life
1889 George Gabriel Stokes On some effects of the action of light on ponderable matter
1890 Richard Claverhouse Jebb Erasmus
1891 Alfred Comyn Lyall Natural religion in India
1892 Thomas George Bonney The microscope's contributions to the earth's physical history
1893 Michael Foster Weariness
1894 John Willis Clark Libraries in the Medieval and Renaissance Periods
1895 Mandell Creighton The Early Renaissance in England
1896 J. J. Thomson Röntgen rays
1897 Arthur William Rücker Recent researches on terrestrial magnetism
1898 Henry Irving The theatre in its relation to the state
1899 Marie Alfred Cornu La théorie des ondes lumineuses: son influence sur la physique moderne

1900-1949
1900 Frederic Harrison Byzantine history in the early middle age
1901 Frederic William Maitland English Law and the Renaissance
1902 Osborne Reynolds On an inversion of ideas as to the structure of the Universe
1903 George Walter Prothero Napoleon III and the Second Empire
1904 James Alfred Ewing The structure of metals
1905 Francis Edward Younghusband Our true relationship with India
1906 William Mitchell Ramsay The wars between Moslem and Christian for the possession of Asia Minor
1907 Aston Webb The art of architecture, and the training required to practise it
1908 Ernest Mason Satow An Austrian diplomatist in the fifties
1909 Archibald Geikie Charles Darwin as Geologist
1910 Charles Harding Firth The parallel between the English and American Civil Wars
1911 Charles Algernon Parsons The Steam Turbine
1912 George Gilbert Aimé Murray The chorus in Greek tragedy
1913 George Nathaniel Curzon Modern Parliamentary Eloquence
1914 Norman Moore St Bartholomew's Hospital in peace and war
1915 Frederic George Kenyon Ideals and characteristics of English culture
1916  George Forrest Browne The ancient cross-shafts of Bewcastle and Ruthwell
1917 Richard Tetley Glazebrook Science and industry
1918 Louis Alexander Mountbatten, 1st Marquess of Milford Haven The Royal Navy, 1815–1915
1919 Lord Moulton, Science and War
1920 James Scorgie Meston, 1st Baron Meston India at the crossways
1921 William Napier Shaw The air and its ways
1922 William Ralph Inge The Victorian Age
1923 Hendrick Antoon Lorentz Clerk Maxwell's electromagnetic theory
1924 Herbert Hensley Henson Byron
1925 Hugh Walpole Some notes on the evolution of the English novel
1926 Arthur Mayger Hind Claude Lorrain and modern art
1927 Josiah Stamp On stimulus in the economic life
1928 Michael Ernest Sadler Thomas Day: an English disciple of Rousseau
1929 John Buchan The Causal and the Casual in History
1930 James Hopwood Jeans The mysterious universe, resulting in the book The Mysterious Universe
1931 George Stuart Gordon Robert Bridges
1932 Edgar Allison Peers St. John of the Cross
1933 Charles Scott Sherrington Brain and its mechanism
1934 Hugh Pattison Macmillan Two ways of thinking
1935 Alfred Daniel Hall The pace of progress
1936 Cedric Webster Hardwicke The drama to-morrow
1937 Harold George Nicolson The Meaning Of Prestige
1938 Patrick Playfair Laidlaw Virus diseases and viruses
1939 Edward Mellanby Some social and economic implications of the recent advances in medical science
1940 Augustus Moore Daniel Some approaches to judgment in painting
1941 E. M. Forster Virginia Woolf
1942 Archibald MacLeish American opinion of the war
1943 Max Beerbohm Lytton Strachey's writings
1944 Richard Winn Livingstone Plato and modern education
1945 Norman Birkett National Parks and the countryside
1946 Edward Victor Appleton Terrestrial magnetism and the ionosphere
1947 Hubert Douglas Henderson The uses and abuses of economic planning
1948 Walter Hamilton Moberly Universities and the state
1949 Ernest William Barnes Religion and turmoil

1950-1999
1950 Edward Bridges Portrait of a Profession
1951 Cecil Maurice Bowra Inspiration and poetry
1952 Walter Russell Brain The Contribution of Medicine to our Idea of the Mind
1953 Arthur Duncan Gardner The proper study of mankind
1954  Charles Alfred Coulson Science and religion: a changing relationship
1955 Lord David Cecil Walter Pater - the Scholar Artist
1956 John Betjeman The English Town in the Last Hundred Years
1957 Robert Wyndham Ketton-Cremer Matthew Prior
1958  Charles Galton Darwin The problems of world population
1959 C. P. Snow The Two Cultures and the Scientific Revolution
1960 Edgar Wind Classicism
1961 Lord Radcliffe Censors
1962 Robert Hall Planning
1963 Douglas William Logan The Years of Challenge
1964 Kenneth Hurlstone Jackson The oldest Irish tradition - a window on the early Iron Age
1965 Gavin de Beer Genetics and prehistory
1966 Harold McCarter Taylor Why should we study the Anglo-Saxons?
1967 Kenneth Wheare The university in the news
1968 Patrick Arthur Devlin, Lord Devlin The House of Lords and the Naval Prize Bill 1911
1969 Patrick Maynard Stuart Blackett The gap widens
1970 Kenneth Clark The artist grows old
1971 Herbert Butterfield The discontinuities between the generations in History: their effect on the transmission of political experience
1972  None
1973 Kingsley Dunham Non-renewable resources - a dilemma
1974 Walter Laing Macdonald Perry Higher education for adults: where more means better
1975 Alfred Alistair Cooke The American in England: from Emerson to S. J. Perelman
1976 Rupert Cross The golden thread of English Criminal Law: the burden of proof
1977 Richard Southern The historical experience
1978 Margaret Gowing Reflections on Atomic Energy History
1979 The Duke of Edinburgh Philosophy, politics and administration
1980 Shirley Williams Technology, employment, and change
1981 Frederick Sydney Dainton British universities: purposes, problems, and pressures
1982 Fred Hoyle Facts and Dogmas in Cosmology and Elsewhere
1983 David Towry Piper The increase of learning and other great objects
1984 Sir Clive Sinclair A time for change
1985 Brian Urquhart The United Nations and international law
1986 David Attenborough Islands
1987 Sir John Thompson A reconsideration of the ideas underlying the international system
1988 Roy Jenkins Lord Jenkins of Hillhead; 'An Oxford view of Cambridge' 
1989 Peter Alexander Ustinov Communication
1990 The Princess Royal Punishment
1991 Peter Swinnerton-Dyer Policy on Higher Education and Research
1993 L. M. Singhvi A Tale of Three Cities
1994 Geoffrey Howe Nationalism and the Nation State
1996 Mary Robinson
1997 Leon Brittan Globalisation vs. Sovereignty? The European Response
1998 Rosalyn Higgins International Law in a Changing Legal System

2000 onwards
2009 Wen Jiabao See China in the Light of Her Development
2010 Onora O'Neill The Two Cultures Fifty Years On
2011 Harold Varmus The Purpose and Conduct of Science
2012 Lord Turner of Ecchinswell The Purpose of the University: Knowledge and Human Wellbeing in the Modern Economy
2015 Drew Gilpin Faust Two Wars and the Long Twentieth Century: the United States, 1861–65; Britain 1914–18
2017 Sue Desmond-Hellmann Facts or Fear? The Case for Facts
2019 Jane Goodall Reasons for Hope

Notes

External links
 Listing

Lecture series at the University of Cambridge